The Cotuit Kettleers are a collegiate summer baseball team based in the village of Cotuit, Massachusetts, which is in the southwest corner of the town of Barnstable. The team is a member of the Cape Cod Baseball League (CCBL) and plays in the league's West Division. The Kettleers play their home games at Lowell Park in Cotuit. The team has been owned and operated by the non-profit Cotuit Athletic Association since 1947.

The Kettleers most recently won the CCBL championship in 2019 when they defeated the Harwich Mariners two games to none to win the best of three championship series. The title was the team's seventeenth overall, including two separate strings of four consecutive titles (1961–64 and 1972–75). Cotuit's record of fifteen titles in the modern era (1963–present) and seventeen overall is unmatched among CCBL franchises. The team has been led since 2004 by field manager Mike Roberts.

History

Pre-modern era

Origins of baseball in Cotuit
Baseball in the village of Cotuit dates back to the early days of the sport on Cape Cod. The Cotuit team split a home-and-home series with a team from Osterville in 1883, and defeated West Barnstable in a July 4 baseball game in 1888. Cotuit took both ends of a July 4 doubleheader against Falmouth in 1904, and repeated the feat in 1905, sweeping Falmouth in another holiday twin bill. It was reported of Cotuit's 1905 team that, "the people of the village and the summer guests in town are well pleased with the various games played here this season," and that team manager David Goodspeed "has been able to give to the public an interesting series of games."

The early Cape League era (1923–1939)
In 1923, the Cape Cod Baseball League was formed and originally included Falmouth, Chatham, and two teams representing villages from the town of Barnstable: Osterville and Hyannis. After the 1930 season, Osterville and Hyannis merged to form a single "Barnstable" town team. In addition to being represented in the CCBL by this town team, the village of Cotuit also fielded its own team in the Upper Cape Twilight League.

The Upper and Lower Cape League era (1946–1962)
The Cape Cod Baseball League was revived in 1946 after taking a hiatus during World War II, and was originally composed of 11 teams across Upper Cape and Lower Cape divisions. Barnstable's entry in the 1946 Lower Cape Division played at the Barnstable High School field in Hyannis. The following season, the Barnstable team moved to the Upper Cape Division, where it competed against a newly-formed second Barnstable team from the village of Cotuit.

The Cotuit Athletic Association was formed in 1947 with the primary objective of sponsoring the village's new Cape League franchise. The team played at Lowell Park, and soon came to be known as the "Kettleers", a nickname credited to Cape Cod Standard-Times sports editor Ed Semprini, who used the moniker in his coverage of the Cotuit team. The term recalls a legendary local land transaction between early area settlers and Native Americans, the terms of sale involving the exchange of a brass kettle. The inaugural 1947 team featured first baseman Manny Robello and his twin brother, player-manager Victor Robello. Manny went on to serve for many years as president of the Cotuit Athletic Association, and was known as the "original Kettleer". At his passing in 1986, the league established an annual 10th Player Award named in his honor.

CCBL Hall of Famer Arnold Mycock joined the organization in 1949, and became the team's general manager the following year, a post he held until 1995. Mycock's organizational skills, energy and vision were instrumental not only in making Cotuit a model franchise, but also as "the singular driving force behind the Cape League’s success." Cotuit got its first taste of postseason action in 1949. The team was led by CCBL Hall of Famer Jim Perkins, a burly slugger who led the league with a .432 batting average and 12 homers, and was featured in Ripley's Believe It or Not! for his feat that season of belting two grand slams in a single inning. Cotuit finished atop the Upper Cape Division standings for the 1949 season's second half, but was downed by first half champ Falmouth in the Upper Cape finals. The Kettleers reached the Upper Cape playoff finals again in 1950, 1951 and 1954, but in each season the powerful Sagamore Clouters prevented Cotuit from advancing to the Cape League finals.

The 1955 Kettleers featured the big bat of Jim Perkins and the sterling moundwork of fellow CCBL Hall of Famer Cal Burlingame, considered by many to be the best Cape League player of the era. Facing old nemesis Sagamore in the Upper Cape playoff finals, Cotuit finally broke through to claim the Upper Cape crown and advance to the Cape League title series, where the Kettleers were shut down by perennial Lower Cape powerhouse Orleans.

Perkins was the team's player-manager in the 1956 and 1957 seasons. Burlingame left to pitch for Barnstable in 1956, but returned to Cotuit in 1957 and 1958. CCBL Hall of Fame fireballer Donald Hicks joined the Kettleers in 1956. Hicks was the star of the 1948 CCBL champion Mashpee Warriors, and had been Upper Cape league MVP for Mashpee in 1950. After the Mashpee team dissolved following the 1955 season, Hicks joined Cotuit and played for the Kettleers through 1960. CCBL Hall of Famer Jim Hubbard joined the Kettleers in 1959 after winning a CCBL title with Yarmouth the prior season. Hubbard played for Cotuit for three seasons, serving as player-manager in 1961, and then as full-time manager throughout the rest of the 1960s.

Hubbard's 1961 Kettleers featured a pair of CCBL Hall of Fame southpaws: Bob Butkus, a 17-year-old from Boston Latin School posted a 4–1 record with a 1.75 ERA, and Boston College's Bernie Kilroy, who had joined Cotuit the previous season and been named Upper Cape league MVP. Both became perennial CCBL all-stars throughout the 1960s. The '61 team also featured all-star hurler Dick Mayo and fellow all-star Tony Capo, a left fielder from Holy Cross. Cotuit finished the regular season with a dominating 24–4 record, and dropped Barnstable in the first round of the Upper Cape playoffs. In the Upper Cape finals, the Kettleers swept Falmouth in two straight, with Mayo tossing a one-hit shutout in the Game 2 clincher. In the Cape League title series, Cotuit was matched up against the Lower Cape champion Yarmouth Indians, who had won CCBL crowns in two of the previous three seasons. Mayo one-hit the Indians in Game 1, but it wasn't enough as the Kettleers took a tight 3–2 loss at home. Cotuit bounced back in Game 2 with a 5–0 Kilroy shutout at Yarmouth. The Kettleers sent Butkus to the mound for the pivotal Game 3 at Lowell Park, and the home team came away with a 7–2 win, clinching Cotuit's first CCBL championship.

The 1962 Cotuit club returned outfielder Capo and hurlers Kilroy, Butkus and Mayo, and added CCBL Hall of Fame catcher Jack McCarthy. McCarthy, like Butkus the previous season, joined the team as a 17-year-old Boston Latin School student. The '62 Kettleers boasted ten batters with season averages over the .300 mark, including McCarthy, Capo and Mayo, as well as the infield quartet of Jeff Helzel (1B), Bill Prizio (2B), Paul Morano (SS) and Stan Sikorsky (3B). The team finished another dominant regular season with a record of 25–5, and met Bourne in the first round of the Upper Cape playoffs. Butkus tossed a two-hitter for the 2–1 Game 1 win, and the Kettleers finished the Bourne sweep in Game 2 with a 5–1 Kilroy three-hitter powered by longballs off the bats of Helzel and McCarthy. Cotuit managed another sweep in the Upper Cape finals, disposing of Sagamore in two straight, including a 15–4 Game 1 pasting of the Clouters. The Cape League championship series against Harwich was played as a Labor Day doubleheader. In Game 1, the Kettleers dished out a 14–0 clubbing at Lowell Park, with Butkus tossing the two-hit shutout. Kilroy was almost as good in Game 2 on the road, allowing only four Harwich hits. Helzel's three-run homer was all Kilroy needed in a 3–0 victory that secured Cotuit's second consecutive Cape League title.

Modern era (1963–present)
In 1963, the CCBL was reorganized and became officially sanctioned by the NCAA. The league would no longer be characterized by "town teams" who fielded mainly Cape Cod residents, but would now be a formal collegiate league. Teams began to recruit college players and coaches from an increasingly wide geographic radius. The league was originally composed of ten teams, which were divided into Upper Cape and Lower Cape divisions. The Kettleers joined Wareham, Falmouth, Bourne and Sagamore in the Upper Cape Division.

The 1960s and Hubbard's "four-peat"
In 1963, the Kettleers continued to ride their success into the newly-reorganized league, returning many of the same faces, including McCarthy, Kilroy, Mayo, Helzel, Sikorsky, and Butkus, who was the league's Outstanding Pitcher with a minuscule 1.04 ERA. All-American basketballer Cotton Nash of Adolph Rupp's Kentucky Wildcats joined the Kettleers as a pitcher/outfielder. Cotuit finished the regular season with a 28–4 record and first-place finish in the Upper Cape Division, and earned a bye in the first round of playoffs. The Kettleers met Wareham in the Upper Cape finals, but dropped Game 1, 1–0, for the hard-luck loser Butkus, who had tossed a two-hitter. Cotuit bounced back to take Game 2 by a 3–1 tally, and Butkus got his revenge in Game 3 as he pitched the Kets to a 5–2 series-clinching win. Game 1 of the Cape League championship series against Orleans was the Bernie Kilroy show. The all-star did the moundwork and also drove in three runs on three hits to help his own cause in Cotuit's 5–4 win at Lowell Park. Game 2 at Eldredge Park saw the Kettleers bang out a 7–1 victory on five hits and 14 walks to give Hubbard's crew their third consecutive Cape League crown.

Hubbard's 1964 squad returned McCarthy, Butkus and Kilroy, who was the league's Outstanding Pitcher with a 1.44 ERA and 72 strikeouts with only 16 walks in 62.1 innings. To this championship core, the Kettleers added outfielder/pitcher and league MVP Ken Huebner, as well as 1964 All-American hurler Keith Weber, who pitched later that summer for the United States at the 1964 Summer Olympics in Tokyo, Japan. The Kettleers finished the regular season with an astonishing 31–3 record, and faced the Lower Cape Division champion Chatham in the CCBL title series. Cotuit sent Weber to the mound at home for Game 1, and came away with a 4–0 shutout. Weber allowed only three hits in the win, and the Kettleers got a pair of RBI's each from McCarthy and Huebner. In Game 2 at Veterans Field, Kilroy took the hill and Butkus came on in relief in a 6–3 Kettleers' win that gave Cotuit an unprecedented fourth consecutive league championship.

After the '64 title, Hubbard continued to skipper the Kettleers throughout the 1960s, but the team finished no better than second place, and did not return again to the championship series in the decade. The trio of Butkus, Kilroy and McCarthy was together for one last season in 1965, and Kilroy continued to twirl for Cotuit through 1967. CCBL Hall of Famer Bob Hansen starred for the Kettleers from 1966 to 1968, an all-star first baseman/outfielder, he was voted to the CCBL's 1960's all-decade team, and went on to play in parts of two seasons with the Milwaukee Brewers. The 1967 Kettleers pitching staff included Jim Courier and Doug Smith, both of whom tossed no-hitters for Cotuit, as well as Bill Richardson, who went on to become the Governor of New Mexico and the United States Ambassador to the United Nations.

The 1970s and McCarthy's "four-peat"
Longtime Kettleer star Jack McCarthy succeeded Hubbard as skipper in 1970. The Kettleers qualified for postseason play in eight of nine years under McCarthy's leadership, and claimed the CCBL crown five times. The 1971 club featured a trio of star moundsmen in Rick Burley, who won seven with four shutouts and tossed a no-hitter, University of Rhode Island star Brian Sheekey, who struck out 96 in 96 innings, and Don Douglas, who won nine games and posted a 1.70 ERA in 90 innings.

McCarthy's 1972 squad finished the regular season in a three-way tie for first place with Falmouth and Orleans. The team featured Florida State University's Tim Sherrill, who batted .354, Rice University slugger Joe Zylka, who bashed 14 long-balls on the season, and ace hurler Ken Schultz, who won eight games for Cotuit, striking out 89 in 86 innings. The Kettleers took the semi-final series against Falmouth, two games to one, and met fourth-place upset winner Chatham in the best-of-five Cape League title series. Cotuit came away with a three games to one series victory over the A's, winning the Game 4 finale 5–4 on two homers by Sherrill and another by Rick Burley.

The 1973 Kettleers returned the power-hitting Zylka, and also featured future major leaguers Jack Kucek and Danny Goodwin, a CCBL all-star who tied the Cotuit team record with six triples. The team finished the regular season in second place and swept Wareham in the playoff semi-finals, getting wins from Ken Herbst and lefty Rob Klass. The Kettleers faced Yarmouth in the best-of-five CCBL title series, and took Game 1 with Kucek on the mound, 6–2. Game 2 at Yarmouth was tied 6–6 after 11 innings and had to be called. The Red Sox took the following game to knot the series, but Cotuit took the next two to claim the crown.

Plagued by injuries, the 1974 Kettleers eked into the playoffs as a fourth-place team with a record just above the .500 mark. The team featured two CCBL Hall of Famers in Boston College third baseman Paul O'Neill and pitcher Jeff Reardon, who went on to amass 367 big league saves. The team also featured Stanford University's Bob Hampton, who clouted 10 homers, Harvard University hurler Don Driscoll, and pitcher Ken Herbst, who returned from the '73 title team. Facing first place Wareham in the semifinal playoffs, the Kettleers dropped Game 1, 5–0, and seemed primed for an early exit. But Cotuit bounced back at home with Reardon on the mound, winning 6–2. In the Game 3 series finale at Clem Spillane Field, Driscoll tossed a six-hitter and the Kettleers prevailed in a tight 3–2 contest, moving on to face Orleans in the best-of-five title tilt. Cotuit took Game 1 of the finals at Orleans, 6–2, but the Cardinals stormed back to take Games 2 and 3. The Kettleers got back on track in Game 4 at Lowell Park, as Driscoll spun a two-hitter, and the Kets walked off an exciting 3–2 win in the ninth as O'Neill came home from second on a bunt single and throwing error. Prior to Game 5, an emergency call went out to Herbst, who had left the team several days earlier to return to the University of Minnesota. McCarthy had run out of pitchers, so Herbst was flown back to take the mound for the Game 5 finale at Eldredge Park. With the score tied at 1–1 going into the bottom of the seventh, Orleans put a man on second with two outs. The next batter hit a grounder and Herbst, covering first, dropped the throw, then threw home too high to get the runner. Cotuit tied it in the top of the eighth, and Herbst found his redemption at the plate in the ninth. With one out, he bashed a triple, then came home with two out on a ball through the second baseman's glove. In a most improbable season, an improbable hero had earned Cotuit its third consecutive league title.

In 1975, the Kettleers returned Reardon and O'Neill, who led the league with a .358 batting average and was named league MVP. McCarthy's club also featured future major league hurler Joe Beckwith, and faced Orleans in the playoff semi-finals. In Game 1, Beckwith went the distance, and Boston College's Al Bassignani provided the clout with two homers and five RBI's to go with his ninth-inning home run robbery of a Roger LaFrancois drive with two men on, as the Kettleers took the opener, 7–1. Reardon got the start in Game 2, and Cotuit came away with a 5–2 win to sweep the series. The best-of-five Cape League finals matched Cotuit against the Falmouth Commodores, and the Kettleers seemed to be rolling along, taking both Games 1 and 2. The Commodores responded by taking the next two to even the series and send it to a decisive Game 5 at Falmouth. The Kettleers grabbed the crown with a 14–3 romp that featured six Cotuit homers, including two by O'Neill and a grand slam by Barry Butera. With a fourth consecutive CCBL title, McCarthy's Kettleers had matched Hubbard's feat of the prior decade, and brought Cotuit its eighth championship overall.

The Kettleers' streak was stopped in 1976 by a talented Wareham team that bounced Cotuit in the playoff semifinals and went on to take the league title. McCarthy's boys rebounded quickly, finishing in first place in 1977 with a team that starred CCBL Hall of Famer Del Bender, an all-league left fielder who led the CCBL with a .395 batting average and set a modern-era league record with 64 hits. The team also featured the league's Outstanding Pro Prospect in ace hurler Brian Denman, second baseman and future major leaguer Gary Redus, and slugger Joe Rietano, who crushed 14 homers on the season. The Kettleers faced Wareham in the playoff semi-finals, and took Game 1, 11–8, getting two homers by Bender and a three-run shot by Redus. Cotuit completed the sweep in Game 2 as Redus stole three bags and scored three runs in the Kettleers' 12–1 shellacking of the Gatemen. The best-of-five championship series matched the Kettleers with the Yarmouth-Dennis Red Sox. Game 1 seemed to portend a lopsided series, as the Kettleers ran roughshod over the Red Sox, banging five homers and getting five RBI's from Bender in a 19–3 rout. The Cotuit bats exploded again for a 15–11 win in Game 2, knocking Y-D for 24 hits in a slugfest that featured three homers by Y-D's league MVP Steve Balboni. The Red Sox battled back to even the series, however, taking Game 3, 10–1, and Game 4, 5–4. In the decisive Game 5 at Lowell Park, the Kettleers found themselves down 3–0 in the third, but starter Kevin Waldrop allowed just two more Y-D hits over the final six innings, and the Kettleers scratched their way to an 8–3 win to claim the league crown. The title was the fifth in six years for McCarthy's club.

CCBL Hall of Famer George Greer, who had been a player for Chatham in the 1960s, took the Kettleer helm in 1979. He skippered the club for nine seasons, qualifying for postseason play in all nine campaigns, and winning three league titles. In Greer's first season, the Kettleers starred CCBL Hall of Fame second baseman and future major leaguer Tim Teufel, who hit .351 and set league records with 16 homers and 52 RBI's.

The 1980s bring three more titles in the Greer era

Greer's 1980 club featured CCBL Hall of Famer Ron Darling, who batted .336 with six home runs while posting a 4–3 mark on the mound, and was named the league's MVP and Outstanding Pro Prospect. At the CCBL All-Star Game at Yankee Stadium, he singled, doubled and homered as the CCBL left fielder, then came on in the final inning to pitch in relief, preserving the CCBL's one-run victory over the Atlantic Collegiate Baseball League.

In 1981, the Kettleers starred CCBL Hall of Famer Jeff Innis, who led the league with a 2.34 ERA and eight saves. The team finished the regular season in fourth place with a mediocre record, but upset first place Wareham in the playoff semifinals. After splitting the first two games of the series, Cotuit took the decisive Game 3 on a masterful three-hitter by Doug Swearingen. In the best-of-five Cape League finals against Orleans, the Kettleers dropped Game 1 at Eldredge Park, but came back to take a tight Game 2, 9–8 in 10 innings. Cotuit sent Swearingen to the mound for Game 3, and jumped out early, taking a 3–0 lead after only four Orleans pitches. The Kettleers walloped four homers, two of them by Billy Dees, and came away with a 9–7 win. In Game 4 at Lowell Park, the Kettleers again took an early lead, up 6–0 after three, on their way to an 8–1 win that secured the team's 10th league title.

Innis returned for the 1982 season, and was all-league once again, posting a 1.96 ERA with 54 strikeouts. He was joined by CCBL Hall of Famer Terry Steinbach, who led the league with a stunning .431 batting average and was named league MVP. The 1983 Kettleers featured another pair of CCBL Hall of Famers. Outfielder Greg Lotzar practically duplicated Steinbach's feat of the previous year, leading the league in batting with a lofty .414 mark, and being named league MVP, while also setting a league record with 33 stolen bases. Future major league all-star Will Clark hit .367 with 10 homers as the Kettleers' first basemen. The talented 1983 team reached the CCBL title series, but was downed by Harwich.

The 1984 Kettleers finished the regular season in third place, and in an unusual move, the league's 1984 playoffs were contested in a four-team double-elimination round-robin format. The tournament came down to a final pair of games between Cotuit and Wareham, a team skippered by a young Mike Roberts. The first game was a must-win for Cotuit, and hurler Joe Lynch was up to the task. Lynch spun a two-hitter, and CCBL Hall of Fame slugger Greg Vaughn doubled and scored the game-winning run on a wild pitch in the fifth that put the Kettleers up by the final 2–1 tally. Cotuit took the decisive final game on the strength of Vaughn's three-run homer in the sixth, claiming its 11th championship crown.

Cotuit's playoff hero Vaughn was back in 1985, and took home league MVP honors, batting .343 with 10 homers and 15 stolen bases. The '85 Kettleers also boasted the league's Outstanding Pro Prospect in John Ramos, as well as future major leaguer Rubén Amaro Jr., and ace hurler Grady Hall. The team finished second in the league with an impressive 28–14 record, and met Harwich in the playoff semifinals. The Kettleers got a three-run dinger from Amaro, and Hall got the win on the mound as Cotuit took Game 1 at home by a 6–3 final. Games 2 & 3 were played as a doubleheader, with the Mariners taking the Game 2 front end, 1–0. Cotuit bats erupted in the Game 3 finale, taking the series with a 10–2 win. In the championship series, the Kettleers faced Chatham, and went down to a 4–3 defeat in Game 1. Cotuit bounced back with an 8–1 win in Game 2 at home behind the stellar moundwork of Hall and an offensive explosion that included a two-run dinger by Vaughn. In the decisive Game 3 finale at Chatham, the Kettleers got a complete game gem from Steffan Majer, Amaro blasted a three-run homer, and Vaughn added a solo shot in Cotuit's 5–2 win. Hall was named playoff MVP, and Greer had his second consecutive title and third overall. The 1986 Kettleers featured the league's Outstanding Pro Prospect, Cris Carpenter, and reached the league title series for the fourth consecutive season, but fell to Orleans.

Another pair of championships in the 1990s
Skipper Roger Bidwell led the Kettleers to a first-place finish atop the West Division in 1992. The team starred CCBL Hall of Famer and Framingham, Massachusetts native Lou Merloni, an infielder from Providence College, who led the league with a .321 batting average and was honored with the league's Sportsmanship Award. Joining Merloni were league MVP Rick Ellstrom, and the CCBL Outstanding Pitcher, John Kelly. The talented '92 squad returned to the league championship series, but was shut down by Chatham.

First-year manager Mike Coutts led Cotuit to another first-place finish in 1995. His club's unquestioned star was CCBL Hall of Fame catcher/outfielder Josh Paul, who won the league's batting crown with a .364 mark, and slugged .652 on his way to being named both the league MVP and Outstanding Pro Prospect. The team also boasted CCBL Hall of Fame pitcher Jack Cressend, who went 7–1 with a 2.44 ERA for the Kettleers. In the playoff semifinals against Wareham, Cressend had the Kets tied 1–1 going into the final frame of Game 1, but couldn't hold the lead as the Gatemen pushed across two to take the opener, 3–1. Game 2 provided more late-inning drama as Josh Gandy tossed seven scoreless innings and Cotuit won it in the 10th on Brandon Berger's two-run dinger. Cotuit's Ryan Lynch pitched brilliantly in Game 3, and the game was scoreless until the eighth when the Kettleers pushed across the game's only run on a sacrifice fly to win the series. In the finals, Cotuit met East Division champ Chatham, and took Game 1 handily, 16–6. Cressend got touched up for seven runs in Chatham's 9–3 Game 2 win, setting up the Game 3 rubber match at Lowell Park. Coutts sent Gandy to the hill, and the game was tight until the Kettleers erupted for seven runs in the fifth, punctuated by Glenn Davis' three-run bomb. Gandy held the Chatham bats at bay, and Kevin Sheredy came on in relief to get the final five outs and secure the crown for the Kettleers. Gandy and Paul shared playoff MVP honors.

Coutts' 1996 Kettleers returned hurlers Cressend and Gandy, and both had memorable seasons. Cressend improved on his impressive prior season's marks, going 7–0 with a 1.89 ERA, and Gandy tossed a no-hitter in a 1–0 victory over Wareham.

Tom Walter took over for Coutts in 1997 and 1998, but Coutts was back in 1999 and led the team to another first-place finish. The '99 team starred CCBL Hall of Famer Garrett Atkins, an all-star infielder who had batted .383 for the Kettleers in 1998, and returned to have another all-star season in 1999. Cotuit met Wareham in the playoff semifinals, and swept the Gatemen in two straight. The Game 2 finale was a masterful 5–0 complete game two-hit shutout by pitcher Andy Warren, with the offensive highlight coming in the third with a three-run blast by Atkins. Cotuit met Chatham in the finals for the third time in the decade, having split the previous two meetings. The teams split the first two games of the 1999 title tilt, setting up a decisive Game 3. The Kettleers sent 6-foot-7 righty Mike Schultz to the hill, and staked him to an early 4–0 lead on an RBI single and homer by Atkins. Schultz made it hold up, tossing a complete game in Cotuit's 7–1 victory. Atkins was named playoff MVP of the Kettleers' 14th championship campaign.

The 2000s: The Roberts era begins
Garrett Quinn piloted the Kettleers to a first-place finish atop the West Division in 2002, as Cotuit set a new Cape League record by winning its first 13 games of the season, a streak which included a combined no-hitter against Chatham at Lowell Park by Kettleer moundsmen Joe Little, Jarred Stuart, Kevin Ool, and Josh Banks. The club was led by league MVP Pete Stonard, who led the league with a .348 batting average, and all-star third baseman Brian Snyder, who took home All-Star Game MVP honors for his home run and 3-for-4, 3-RBI performance in the West's 4–1 victory.

Skipper Mike Roberts took the Kettleer helm in 2004, and became the longest-tenured manager in team history. First baseman and CCBL Hall of Famer Justin Smoak was league MVP for Cotuit in 2006, leading the league with 11 homers, 21 extra-base hits, and a .565 slugging percentage. The Kettleers reached the league championship series in 2008, but were downed by Harwich. In a season highlighted by Chad Bell's no-hitter against Chatham, Roberts again led the 2009 Kettleers to the league championship, but the club was shut down by Bourne.

The 2010s: Three more titles and the passing of a Cotuit legend
Roberts' 2010 Kettleers finished the regular season with a losing record, but qualified for the playoffs out of the third place slot in the West Division. After early-round playoff series sweeps of Falmouth and Wareham, the Kettleers met Y-D in the Cape League championship series. In Game 1, Matt Andriese tossed a complete game shutout and Cotuit played small-ball to scratch out a 3–0 win at Red Wilson Field. The Red Sox answered with a 2–1 victory in Game 2, the only Cotuit run coming on an eighth inning homer by James McCann. In Game 3, Cotuit got a homer and a single from Mike Yastrzemski and three hits from Joey Hainsfurther, while Nick Tropeano was shutting down the Red Sox on the mound. The Kettleers rolled to a 6–0 victory for the team's 15th CCBL title and first under Roberts. Jordan Leyland was named playoff MVP, hitting .461 with six RBI's in the postseason.

Cotuit's Victor Roache was the CCBL's Outstanding Pro Prospect in 2011, and in 2012, the Kettleers' Dan Slania won the league's Outstanding Relief Pitcher award. CCBL Hall of Famer Patrick Biondi flirted with the .400 mark in 2012 and finished tops in the league in batting average for Cotuit with a .388 mark.
 

Roberts' boys were back in the championship series in 2013. After dropping Game 1 of its opening round playoff series with Falmouth, Cotuit bounced back with an exciting 10-inning 5–4 victory at home, powered by a two-run blast by Austin Byler, and a walk-off 10th inning RBI by Garrett Stubbs. The Kettleers finished off the Commodores with a 5–2 victory at Guv Fuller Field, and went on to meet Bourne in the West Division finals. Byler again went deep in Game 1 at Lowell Park, and Caleb Bryson added a dinger in the 9–2 romp over the Braves. Bourne stormed back in Game 2 at Doran Park, routing Cotuit, 8–1. The Game 3 finale was tied, 3–3, in the eighth when Kettleer Drew Jackson poked the game-winning RBI to give Cotuit the series win, and send the Kettleers to the title series to face the Orleans Firebirds. In Game 1 of the 2013 championship, Bryson bashed a two-run first inning homer and Bradley Zimmer belted a two-run single to give Cotuit the 4–2 victory in the opener. Game 2 at Eldredge Park was tight until the eighth, when Cotuit blew it open with four runs on an Orleans error and a two-run knock by Nolan Clark. The Kettleers prevailed, 6–2, to sweep the title series and claim the crown, with Zimmer taking playoff MVP honors.

The Kettleers retired uniform number "1" in 2016, in honor of the passing of Cotuit legend Arnold Mycock, whose decades of service and contribution to the team and league were unparalleled. 2017 saw the passing of another Kettleer mainstay in superfan Ivan Partridge, who began attending Kettleer games in the 1950s, and whose booming encouragement for batters to "Have a hit!" became a signature call at Lowell Park. Kettleers took home top honors in 2017 as Greyson Jenista was named league MVP, and Griffin Conine, son of former major leaguer and Orleans Cardinal Jeff Conine, was named the league's Outstanding Pro Prospect.

The 2019 Kettleers finished the regular season with a .500 record, and appeared primed for an early playoff exit after a 10-inning 8–7 loss in Game 1 of the opening round of playoffs at Wareham. Cotuit responded with an offensive eruption in Game 2, pummeling the Gatemen, 22–2, behind a five-RBI performance by Kettleer Oraj Anu. In the decisive Game 3, the Kettleers got a homer from Matt Mervis, and Casey Schmitt twirled the final five innings of two-hit shutout relief in the 4–1 win. In Game 1 of the West Division finals at Falmouth, Cotuit moundsmen Trey Holland and Bo Hofstra combined for a 5–0 shutout win. The Kettleers completed the sweep at home in Game 2 behind a two-run blast by league MVP Nick Gonzales, and a solo shot by Parker Chavers in the 5–3 win that sent Cotuit to the championship series in search of its 17th league title. The 2019 CCBL finals pitted the Kettleers against the Harwich Mariners. Game 1 at Whitehouse Field was a marathon five-hour affair, featuring 6 scoreless innings of relief in extra innings by pitcher Richard Brereton. Gonzales ended the stalemate in the top of the 15th with an RBI single to put Cotuit up 7–6, and closer Kyle Nicolas came on in the bottom of the frame to strike out the side and preserve the Kettleer win. Game 2 at Lowell Park saw Schmitt, who was named playoff MVP, blast two home runs then come in to pitch the ninth inning in relief in a 10–3 rout of the Mariners that secured the crown for Cotuit. The 2019 title brought the Kettleer championship count to 15 in the modern era and 17 overall, a record that is unmatched among CCBL franchises.

The 2020s
The 2020 CCBL season was cancelled due to the coronavirus pandemic.

CCBL Hall of Fame inductees

The CCBL Hall of Fame and Museum is a history museum and hall of fame honoring past players, coaches, and others who have made outstanding contributions to the CCBL. Below are the inductees who spent all or part of their time in the Cape League with Cotuit.

Notable alumni

A. J. Achter 2010
Jermaine Allensworth 1992
Rubén Amaro Jr. 1985–1986
Brian Anderson 2002
Matt Andriese 2010
Matt Angle 2006
Randy Asadoor 1982
Garrett Atkins 1998–1999
Jeff Austin 1996
John Axford 2003
Jeff Baisley 2003
Josh Banks 2002
Tres Barrera 2014
Chris Beck 2011
Joe Beckwith 1975
Dylan Beavers 2021
Chad Bell 2009
Mark Bellhorn 1993
Brandon Berger 1995
Dusty Bergman 1998
Jason Beverlin 1993
Chris Bisson 2009
Dan Black 2008
Charlie Blackmon 2005
Seth Blair 2008–2009
Julio Borbón 2005
Brad Brach 2007
Darren Bragg 1989
Ryan Braun, RHP 2002
Jerry Brooks 1987
Rex Brothers 2007
Eric Brown 2021
Hunter Brown 2018
Barret Browning 2005
J. T. Bruett 1986–1988
Eric Bruntlett 1997
Jake Buchanan 2009
Kevin Buckley 1978
Troy Buckley 1988
Mike Buddie 1990–1991
Damon Buford 1989–1990
Nate Bump 1996
Peyton Burdick 2018
Kevin Campbell 1984
Andy Cannizaro 1999
Chris Capuano 1997–1998
Cris Carpenter 1986
Curt Casali 2010
Giuseppe Chiaramonte 1996
Rick Chryst 1982
Matt Clark 2007
Will Clark 1983
Mike Clevinger 2011
Cam Collier 2022
Zack Collins 2015
Steve Comer 1974
Zack Cox 2009
Doug Creek 1990
Jack Cressend 1995–1996
C. J. Cron 2010
Brandon Cumpton 2008
Ron Darling 1980
Noah Davis 2017
Jason Delay 2016
Brian Denman 1977
Sean DePaula 1994
Thomas Dillard 2017–2018
Jason Donald 2004–2005
Steven Duggar 2013
Justin Dunn 2015
Chris Dwyer 2009
Chris Ellis 2013
Scott Erickson 1989
Geno Espineli 2002–2003
Eric Farris 2006
Darren Fenster 1998
Chris Fetter 2007
Kyle Finnegan 2012
Jeff Fiorentino 2003
Jameson Fisher 2014
Bernardo Flores 2015
Ryan Folmar 1994
Mike Ford 2012–2013
John Franco 1980
Matt Galante 1964
Aramis Garcia 2012–2013
Cory Gearrin 2006
Tony Giarratano 2002
Kevin Ginkel 2015
Joe Girardi 1984
Graham Godfrey 2006
Yan Gomes 2007
Nick Gonzales 2019
Danny Goodwin 1973
Matt Grace 2009
Kendall Graveman 2011
Jason Grilli 1995
Justin Grimm 2009
Bob Hansen 1967–1968
Aaron Harang 1998
Josh Harrison 2007
Bo Hart 1998
Reese Havens 2006–2007
Brett Hayes 2004
Chase Headley 2004
Ryon Healy 2011
Joe Hesketh 1979
Bryan Hickerson 1985
Luke Hochevar 2003
Mario Hollands 2008
Tyler Holt 2008
Ken Howell 1981
Justin Huisman 1999
Jeff Innis 1981–1982
Brett Jackson 2008
Drew Jackson 2014
Tom Jacquez 1996
Bryce Jarvis 2018
Kevin Jarvis 1990
Dan Jennings 2008
Mike Jerzembeck 1993
Keith Johns 1991
Micah Johnson 2011
Barry Jones 1983
Caleb Joseph 2007
Jimmy Journell 1998
Tony Kemp 2012
Jeren Kendall 2015–2016
Jeff Kent 1988
Jason Kipnis 2008
Daron Kirkreit 1992
Jeff Kobernus 2008
Tim Kubinski 1992
Jack Kucek 1973
Kellen Kulbacki 2006
Marc LaMacchia 2002
Brett Laxton 1994
Jack Lazorko 1976
Kyle Lewis 2014
Derek Lilliquist 1986–1987
Josh Lindblom 2007
Ryan Lollis 2007
Braden Looper 1994
Mike MacDougal 1997
Luke Maile 2011
Jeff Manship 2005
Deven Marrero 2010–2011
Bill Masse 1985–1987
Mike Matheny 1989
Justin Maxwell 2004
Jacob May 2012
Tim Mayza 2012
Patrick Mazeika 2013
James McCann 2010
David McCarty 1989
Adam McCreery 2012
Jason McDonald 1993
Dallas McPherson 2000
Lou Merloni 1992
Dan Meyer 2001
Bart Miadich 1997
A. J. Minter 2014
Anthony Misiewicz 2015
Daniel Moskos 2005
Tim Naehring 1987
Cotton Nash 1963
John Nathans 2000
Rico Noel 2009
Josh Paul 1995
Mark Payton 2013
Steve Pearce 2004
Kyle Peterson 1995–1996
Robb Quinlan 1997
Omar Quintanilla 2002
John Ramos 1985
Jeff Reardon 1974–1976
Gary Redus 1977
Laddie Renfroe 1982
Raph Rhymes 2012
Garrett Richards 2007
Bill Richardson 1967
Edwin Ríos 2013
Victor Roache 2011
Marteese Robinson 1987
Brady Rodgers 2010
Joshua Rojas 2015
Ben Rowen 2009
Dan Runzler 2006
Cameron Rupp 2009
Kyle Russell 2006
Kirk Saarloos 1999
Mike Saipe 1992–1993
Emeel Salem 2005
Tim Salmon 1988
Clint Sammons 2003
Dane Sardinha 1999
Tim Scannell 1990
Max Schrock 2013
Mike Schultz 1999
J. B. Shuck 2007
Chase Shugart 2017
Brian Simmons 1994
Dan Simonds 1984, 1986
Tony Sipp 2004
Dan Slania 2012
Kyle Sleeth 2001
Brian Slocum 2001
Justin Smoak 2006
D. J. Snelten 2011
Alex Sogard 2008
Josh Spence 2010
Scott Spiezio 1993
Ed Sprague Jr. 1986
Cody Stanley 2009
Terry Steinbach 1982
Mitch Stetter 2001–2002
Cal Stevenson 2016
Robert Stock 2007–2008
Drew Storen 2008
Garrett Stubbs 2013
Tim Teufel 1979
Rich Thompson 1999
Erick Threets 2000
Clay Timpner 2003
Michael Toglia 2017–2018
Nick Tropeano 2010
Chase Utley 1999
Eric Valent 1996
Greg Vaughn 1984–1985
Terrin Vavra 2017
Bobby Wahl 2011
Jared Walsh 2013
Mark Wasinger 1981
Keith Weber 1964
Chris Widger 1991
Dan Wilson 1988
Trey Wingenter 2014
Rhett Wiseman 2013
Mark Worrell 2003
Kyle Wren 2011
Alex Yarbrough 2011
Mike Yastrzemski 2010–2011
Bradley Zimmer 2013
Kyle Zimmer 2011
Kevin Ziomek 2011–2012

Yearly results

Results by season, 1947–1962 

* Regular seasons split into first and second halves are designated as (A) and (B).

Results by season, 1963–present

League award winners

(*) - Indicates co-recipient

All-Star Game selections

Italics - Indicates All-Star Game Home Run Hitting Contest participant (1988 to present)

No-hit games

Managerial history

(*) - Season count excludes 2020 CCBL season cancelled due to coronavirus pandemic.

See also
 Cotuit Kettleers players

References

External links

Rosters

 2000
 2001
 2002
 2003
 2004
 2005
 2006
 2007
 2008
 2009
 2010
 2011
 2012
 2013
 2014
 2015
 2016
 2017
 2018
 2019
 2021
 2022

Other links
Cotuit Kettleers official site
CCBL Home Page

Cape Cod Baseball League teams
Amateur baseball teams in Massachusetts
Barnstable, Massachusetts